Glen Ridge may refer to:

 Glen Ridge, Florida, United States
 Glen Ridge, New Jersey, United States
Glen Ridge High School
 Glen Ridge (NJT station)

See also 
 Glenridge (disambiguation)